Estadio José Rico Pérez is a multi-purpose stadium in Alicante, Spain.  It is currently used mostly for football matches, being home to Hércules CF. It also hosted World Cup matches when Spain organized the event in 1982. With a capacity of 29,500 seats, it is the 19th-largest stadium in Spain and the 3rd-largest in the Valencian Community. It was built in 1974, and is situated 2 miles outside Alicante city centre. The stadium is named after the former chairman of Hércules CF, José Rico Pérez (1918–2010).

Gallery

1982 FIFA World Cup
The stadium was one of the venues of the 1982 FIFA World Cup, and held the following matches:

References

External links
Estadios de España 

1982 FIFA World Cup stadiums
Hércules CF
Alicante CF
Multi-purpose stadiums in Spain
Football venues in the Valencian Community
Buildings and structures in Alicante
1974 establishments in Spain
Sports venues completed in 1974